China trade may refer to

 History of trade of the People's Republic of China
 History of trade of the Republic of China (1949-present)
 Economy of the People's Republic of China
 Economy of the Republic of China
 Economic history of China (pre-1911)
 Economic history of China (1912–1949)
 Old China Trade, the commerce between China and the United States in the late 18th and early 19th century
 China Trade, a novel by S. J. Rozan